Romito may refer to:

 Romito Cave, a natural limestone cave in the Lao Valley of Pollino National Park, Calabria, Italy
 Il Romito, a village of the comune of Pontedera, Province of Pisa, Tuscany, Italy
 Felipe Romito (1893-1962), Argentine singer
 Tommaso Romito (born 1982), Italian footballer

See also 
 Romiti, a surname